Andjingith is an extinct Australian Aboriginal language once spoken in Cape York in Queensland. The traditional language area of Andjingith includes the Aurukun Community Council and the Cook Shire.

Classification 
Andjingith may also be known by the following names: Anjingid, Andjingid, Andjingith, Adyingid.

Tindale (1974) says that Winduwinda is a cover term for twelve or more small groups each with a name terminating in '-ngit'. This suggests that Andjingith might be a Winduwinda group name, despite Tindale not listing it.

References

Northern Paman languages
Extinct languages of Queensland